Sparganothoides xenopsana is a species of moth of the family Tortricidae. It is found in Puebla, Mexico.

The length of the forewings is 11.9–13.1 mm. The ground colour of the forewings is mostly brownish orange, with yellowish brown to orange patches and speckling of dark brown scales. The hindwings are white to pale grey.

Etymology
The species name refers to the unusual appearance of this species when it was discovered in a long series of Sparganothoides hydeana and is derived from Greek xenos (meaning foreign).

References

Moths described in 2009
Sparganothoides